Bernardino de Sousa Monteiro (October 6, 1865 in Cachoeiro de Itapemirim ES – May 12, 1930) was a Brazilian politician.  He was representative on Espirito Santo's State Chamber and on the Brazilian Federal Chamber, Senator of the State of Espirito Santo and, also, the 15th president (governor) of the state of Espirito Santo, from May 23, 1916 to May 23, 1920.  He was elected by the people.

Governors of Espírito Santo
1865 births
1930 deaths
Members of the Chamber of Deputies (Brazil) from Espírito Santo
Members of the Legislative Assembly of Espírito Santo